The Manchester Freedom is a football team in the Independent Women's Football League based in Manchester, New Hampshire. Home games are played at West Memorial Field on the campus of Manchester High School West.

Season-by-season

|-
| colspan="6" align="center" | New Hampshire Freedom (IWFL)
|-
|2001 || colspan="6" rowspan="1" align="center" | Results Unknown
|-
|2002 || 2 || 6 || 0 || 6th East Division || --
|-
|2003 || 3 || 5 || 0 || 3rd East North Atlantic || --
|-
|2004 || 4 || 3 || 1 || 3rd East Mid-Atlantic || --
|-
| colspan="6" align="center" | Manchester Freedom (IWFL)
|-
|2005 || 3 || 7 || 0 || 4th East Mid-Atlantic || --
|-
|2006 || 3 || 4 || 0 || 2nd East North Atlantic || --
|-
|2007 || 6 || 2 || 0 || 1st East Northeast || Lost Eastern Conference Qualifier (New York)
|-
|2008 || 4 || 4 || 0 || 3rd Tier II North Atlantic || --
|-
|2009 || 4 || 5 || 0 || 8th Tier II || Lost Tier II Quarterfinal (Montreal)
|-
|2010 || 0 || 3 || 0 || 5th Tier II East Northeast ||
|-
|2011 || 4 || 4 || 0 || 3rd East North Atlantic ||
|-
!Totals || 33 || 45 || 1
|colspan="2"| (including playoffs)

* = Current Standing

Season schedules

2009

2010

2011

2012

External links
Manchester Freedom official website
IWFL official website

Independent Women's Football League
Sports in Manchester, New Hampshire
American football teams established in 2001
2001 establishments in New Hampshire
Women in New Hampshire